Livadi is a village in Vasilika, Thessaloniki, Greece.

References

Populated places in Thessaloniki (regional unit)

[[